Anthony Philip John "Tony" Chater (21 December 1929 – 2 August 2016) was a British newspaper editor and Communist activist.

Early life
Born in Northampton, Chater attended Northampton Town and County Grammar School, and joined the Communist Party of Great Britain (CPGB) whilst in the sixth form. Chater then studied at Queen Mary, University of London in London, gaining a first (BSc, 1951) and a PhD in chemistry in 1954.  After a two years post-doctoral research fellowship at the Dominion Experimental Farm, Canada, and a year at Brussels University studying biochemistry, he returned to Britain to teach, initially at Northampton Technical High School, later Blyth Grammar School, Norwich, and from 1960 at the Luton College of Technology where he remained until 1969.  He stood in the 1963 Luton by-election as a CPGB candidate, but was placed last gaining only 593 votes.  Despite this, he stood in Luton again in 1964, 1966 and 1970, again without success.

Morning Star
After being the Chair of the Communist Party of Great Britain during 1968–69, Chater began working full-time for the party as its head of press and publicity, and in 1974 he swapped jobs with George Matthews becoming editor of the Morning Star, a daily paper associated with the party. He attempted to get the party executive to prioritise increasing sales, with limited success. The paper, run by the People's Press Printing Society, and the party were coming into open conflict by 1982, disagreeing on approaches to the shop stewards' movement. The following year, the revisionist party leadership attempted to remove Chater's supporters from the executive of the PPPS, but the reverse occurred, and Chater's opponents were defeated instead. Chater, however, was expelled from the CPGB in January 1985. An opposition coalesced around Chater and Mick Costello, but they were defeated at the 1987 Party Congress and subsequently founded the Communist Party of Britain.

Chater stood down as editor of the Morning Star in 1995. He died on 2 August 2016.

References

1930 births
2016 deaths
Alumni of Queen Mary University of London
Communist Party of Britain members
Communist Party of Great Britain members
English newspaper editors
English male journalists
People educated at Northampton School for Boys
Morning Star (British newspaper) journalists
British political party founders